Meir David HaKohen Kahane (born Martin David Kahane; August 1, 1932 – November 5, 1990) was an American-born Israeli ordained Orthodox rabbi, writer, and ultra-nationalist politician who served one term in Israel's Knesset before being convicted of acts of terrorism. A cofounder of the Jewish Defense League (JDL) and founder of the Israeli political party Kach, he espoused strong views against antisemitism.

According to his widow, he organized defense squads and patrols in Jewish neighborhoods, and demanded that the Soviet Union release its oppressed Jews. He supported violence against those he regarded as enemies of the Jewish people, and called for immediate Jewish mass migration to Israel to avoid a potential "Holocaust" in the United States, popularizing the slogan Never Again through a book of the same name. He also popularized the slogan "For Every Jew a  .22." He supported the restriction of Israel's democracy to its Jewish citizens, and endorsed the annexation of the West Bank and Gaza Strip.

In 1968, Kahane was one of the co-founders of the JDL in the United States. In 1971, he co-founded Kach ("Thus"), a new political party in Israel. That same year, he was convicted in New York for conspiracy to manufacture explosives and received a suspended sentence of five years. In Israel, he was convicted for plotting to blow up the Libyan embassy in Brussels in revenge for the massacre of 11 Israeli athletes at the 1972 Summer Olympics in Munich, receiving a suspended sentence and probation. In 1984, he became a member of the Knesset, when Kach gained its only-ever seat in parliamentary elections. Kahane was boycotted across the aisles of the Knesset, and would often speak in front of an empty chamber. The Israel Broadcasting Authority similarly avoided coverage of his activities. The Central Elections Committee tried to ban Kahane from running in the 1984 elections, but this ban was overturned by the Supreme Court because there was no law to support it. In response, the Knesset approved an ad hoc law that allowed for the banning of parties that are "racist" or "undemocratic". In 1988, despite polls showing Kach gaining popularity due in part to the ongoing First Intifada, Kach was banned from entering that year's elections.

Kahane publicized his Kahanism ideology through published works, weekly articles, speeches, debates on college campuses and in synagogs throughout the United States, and appearances on various televised programs and radio shows. In Israel, he proposed enforcing Halakha as codified by Maimonides and hoped that Israel would eventually adopt  Halakha as state law. Non-Jews wishing to dwell in Israel would have three options: remain as "resident strangers" with limited rights, leave Israel and receive compensation for their property, or be forcibly removed without compensation. While serving in the Knesset in the mid-1980s Kahane proposed numerous laws, none of which passed, to emphasize Judaism in public schools, reduce Israel's bureaucracy, forbid sexual relations between Jews and non-Jews, separate Jewish and Arab neighborhoods, and end cultural meetings between Jewish and Arab students.

Kahane was assassinated in a New York City hotel by an Egyptian-born U.S. citizen in November 1990. His legacy continues to influence militant and far-right political groups active today in Israel.

Personal life
Meir Kahane was born in Brooklyn, New York, to an Orthodox Jewish family. Kahane was a member of an established rabbinic family, including his father, who was head of the Flatbush Board of Rabbis. His father, Yechezkel Shragei (Charles) Kahane (1905–1978), had studied at Polish and Czech yeshivas, and was the author of the rabbinic work Torah Yesharah. He was deeply involved in the Revisionist Zionist movement as a close friend of Ze'ev Jabotinsky. Kahane's grandfather was Nachman Kahane (1869–1937), a leading rabbinic scholar in Safed, who was the son of Baruch David Kahane (1850–1925), the author of Hibat ha-Eretz, and a disciple of Chaim Halberstam of Sanz. Baruch David was a direct descendant of Simcha Rappaport (1650–1718), of the Rappaport rabbinic family, who were allegedly able to trace their ancestry back to Eleazar ben Azariah, a 1st-century sage in the Land of Israel. Baruch David immigrated to Mandatory Palestine from Poland in 1873. An uncle of Kahane's was killed in Safed during the 1929 Arab riots.

As a teenager, Kahane became an ardent admirer of Jabotinsky and Peter Bergson, who were frequent guests in his parents' home. He joined the Betar (Brit Trumpeldor) youth wing of Revisionist Zionism. He was active in protests against Ernest Bevin, the British Foreign Secretary who maintained restrictions on the immigration of Jews, even Holocaust survivors, to Palestine after the end of the Second World War. In 1947, Kahane was arrested for throwing eggs and tomatoes at Bevin, who was disembarking at Pier 84 on a visit to New York. A photo of the arrest appeared in the New York Daily News. In 1954, he became the Mazkir (Secretary) of Greater New York City's 16 Bnei Akiva chapters.

Kahane's formal education included Yeshiva of Flatbush for elementary school and  Brooklyn Talmudical Academy for high school. Kahane received his rabbinical ordination from the Mir Yeshiva in Brooklyn, where he was especially admired by the head Rabbi Abraham Kalmanowitz. He was fully conversant in the Tanakh (Jewish Bible), the Talmud, the Midrash and Jewish law. Subsequently, Kahane earned a B.A. in political science from Brooklyn College in 1954, a Bachelor of Law – LL.B. from New York Law School, and an M.A. in International Relations from New York University.

In 1956, Kahane married Libby Blum, with whom he had four children: Tzipporah, Tova, Baruch, and Binyamin. Binyamin became an Orthodox Jewish scholar, rabbi, and far-right political leader aligned with Kahane's political movement, and was later killed in 2000.

In 1966, Kahane, under the alias of Michael King and while already married, had an affair and became engaged to marry the 21-year-old model Gloria Jean D'Argenio (who used the stage name Estelle Donna Evans). Kahane sent a letter to D'Argenio in which he unilaterally ended their relationship. D'Argenio was never aware of Kahane's real identity and at the time she received the letter, she had been expecting him to marry her in two days and had recently learned she was pregnant by him. Upon receiving the letter, D'Argenio jumped off the Queensboro Bridge and died of her injuries the next day. In 2008, Kahane's wife dismissed the incident as lacking proof.

After D'Argenio's death, Kahane started the Estelle Donna Evans Foundation in her name. Kahane claimed D'Argenio had been his former secretary in his failed consulting operation, had died of cancer, and that her "well-to-do" family had endowed the foundation. In reality, the money was used to fund the JDL, including supplies for bombings and Kahane's lavish travel.

Early career

Pulpit rabbi

In 1958, Kahane became the rabbi of the Howard Beach Jewish Center in Queens, New York City. Although the synagog was originally Conservative, rather than strictly Orthodox, the board of directors agreed to Kahane's conditions, which included resigning from the Conservative movement's United Synagogue of America, installing a partition separating men and women during prayer, instituting traditional prayers, and maintaining a kosher kitchen. At the Jewish Center, Kahane influenced many of the synagog's youngsters to adopt a more observant lifestyle, which often troubled parents. He trained Arlo Guthrie for his bar mitzvah. When his contract was not renewed, he soon published an article entitled "End of the Miracle of Howard Beach". That was Kahane's first article in The Jewish Press, an American Orthodox Jewish weekly for which he would continue to write for the rest of his life. Kahane also used the pen name David Sinai, and the pseudonyms Michael King, David Borac, and Martin Keene.

Infiltrating the John Birch Society
In the late 1950s and the early 1960s, Kahane's life of secrecy and his strong anticommunism landed him a position as a consultant with the FBI. According to his wife, Libby, his assignment was to infiltrate the anticommunist John Birch Society and report his findings to the FBI.

Collaboration with Joseph Churba

At some time in the late 1950s, Kahane assumed the persona of a Gentile, along with the pseudonym Michael King. Kahane began openly expressing his anticommunism. He and Joseph Churba created the July Fourth Movement, which was formed to counteract widespread opposition towards U.S. involvement in the Vietnam War. Subsequently, they coauthored the book The Jewish Stake in Vietnam, an attempt to convince American Jews of the "evil of Communism". The introduction states that, "All Americans have a stake in this grim war against Communism... It is vital that Jews realize the threat to their very survival [should Communism succeed]." Churba had a major falling out with Kahane over the use of paramilitary activities, and they parted ways permanently. Churba went on to pursue his own career, joining the U.S. Air Force, writing many books on the Middle East, and eventually becoming one of Ronald Reagan's consultants. Kahane chose to fight for Jewish rights, and was willing to use extreme measures. He even attempted to acquire and grow biological weapons to use on a Soviet military installation. He began using the phrase "Never again" and conceived the Jewish Star and fist insignia, a symbol resembling that of the Black Panther Party. However, Kahane himself opposed the Black Panthers, claiming they had supported anti-Jewish riots in Massachusetts and had left-wing views.

Jewish Defense League
Kahane founded the Jewish Defense League (JDL) in New York City in 1968. Its self-described purpose was to protect Jews from local manifestations of anti-Semitism. Kahane encouraged Jews to take up firearms, through his slogan "every Jew a .22". 

The JDL said it was committed to five fundamental principles:

 Love of Jewry: One Jewish people, indivisible and united, from which flows the love for, and the feeling of pain of, all Jews.
 Dignity and Pride: Pride in and knowledge of Jewish tradition, faith, culture, land, history, strength, pain, and peoplehood.
 Iron: The need to both move to help Jews everywhere and to change the Jewish image through sacrifice and all necessary means—even strength, force, and violence.
 Discipline and Unity: The knowledge that he (or she) can and will do whatever must be done, and the unity and strength of willpower to bring this into reality.
 Faith in the Indestructibility of the Jewish People: Faith in the greatness and indestructibility of the Jewish people, our religion, and our Land of Israel.

According to his wife Libby Kahane, the JDL favored "civil rights for blacks, but opposed black anti-Semites and racism of any form." In 1971, the JDL formed an alliance with a black rights group in what Kahane termed "a turning point in Black-Jewish relations". The Anti-Defamation League claimed that Kahane "preached a radical form of Jewish nationalism which reflected racism, violence and political extremism" that was replicated by Irv Rubin, the JDL's successor to Kahane.

Terrorism and convictions 
A number of the JDL's members and leaders, including Kahane, were convicted of acts related to domestic terrorism. In 1971, Kahane was sentenced to a suspended five-year prison sentence and fined $5,000 for conspiring to manufacture explosives. In 1975, Kahane was arrested for leading the attack on the Soviet United Nations mission and injuring two officers, but he was released after being given summonses for disorderly conduct. Later the same year, Kahane was accused of conspiring to kidnap a Soviet diplomat, bomb the Iraqi embassy in Washington, and ship arms abroad from Israel. He was convicted of violating his probation for the 1971 bombing conviction and was sentenced to one year in prison. However, he served most of it in a hotel, with frequent unsupervised absences, because of a concession over the provision of kosher food.

In a 1984 interview with Washington Post correspondent Carla Hall, Kahane admitted that the JDL "bombed the Russian [Soviet] mission in New York, the Russian cultural mission here [Washington] in 1971, the Soviet trade offices".

Immigration to Israel

In 1971, Kahane moved to Israel. At the time, he declared that he would focus on Jewish education. He later began gathering lists of Arab citizens of the State of Israel who were willing to emigrate for compensation, and eventually, he initiated protests that advocated the expulsion of Arabs from that country, and Israeli-occupied territories. In 1972, Jewish Defense League leaflets were distributed in Hebron, calling for the mayor to stand trial for the 1929 Hebron massacre. Kahane was arrested dozens of times. In 1971, he founded Kach, a political party that ran for the Knesset, the Israeli Parliament, during the 1973 general elections under the name "The League List". It won 12,811 votes (0.82%), just 2,857 (0.18%) short of the electoral threshold at the time (1%) for winning a Knesset seat. The party was even less successful in the 1977 elections, winning only 4,836 votes.

In 1980, Kahane was arrested for the 62nd time since his emigration, and he was jailed for six months after a detention order that was based on allegations of him planning armed attacks against Palestinians in response to the killings of Jewish settlers. Kahane was held in prison in Ramla, where he wrote the book They Must Go. Kahane was banned from entering the UK in 1981.

In 1981, Kahane's party again ran for the Knesset during the 1981 elections, but it did not win a seat and received only 5,128 votes. In 1984, the Israeli Central Elections Committee banned him from being a candidate on the grounds that Kach was a racist party, but the Supreme Court of Israel overturned the ban on the grounds that the committee was not authorized to ban Kahane's candidacy. The Supreme Court suggested that the Knesset pass a law excluding racist parties from future elections. The Knesset responded in 1985 by amending the "Basic Law: Knesset" to include a prohibition (paragraph 7a) against the registration of parties that explicitly or implicitly incite racism.

Election to Knesset 
In the 1984 legislative elections, Kahane's Kach party received 25,907 votes (1.2%), gaining one seat in the Knesset, which was taken by Kahane. He refused to take the standard oath of office and insisted on adding a Biblical verse from Psalms to indicate that national laws were overruled by the Torah if they conflict. Kahane's legislative proposals focused on Jewish education, an open economy, transferring the Arab population out of the Land of Israel, revoking Israeli citizenship from non-Jews, and banning Jewish-Gentile marriages and sexual relations.

While his popularity in Israel grew, Kahane was boycotted in the Knesset, where his speeches were often made to an empty assembly except for the duty chairman and the transcriptionist. The Knesset revoked his Parliamentary immunity to prevent his freedom of movement in areas where his inflammatory rhetoric could cause harm. Kahane's legislative proposals and motions of no-confidence against the government were ignored or rejected. Kahane often pejoratively called other Knesset members "Hellenists," a reference to Jews who assimilated into Greek culture after Judea's occupation by Alexander the Great. 

In 1987, Kahane opened a yeshiva ("HaRaayon HaYehudi") with funding from US supporters to teach "the Authentic Jewish Idea". Despite the boycott, his popularity grew among the Israeli public, especially for working-class Sephardi Jews. Polls showed that Kach would have likely received anywhere from four to twelve seats in the coming November 1988 elections.

In 1985, the Knesset passed an amendment to the Basic Law of Israel, barring political parties that incited to racism. The Central Elections Committee banned Kahane a second time, and he appealed to the Israeli Supreme Court. However, the Supreme Court this time ruled in favor of the committee, disqualifying Kach from running in the 1988 legislative elections. Kahane was thus the first candidate in Israel to be barred from election for racism. The move was criticized as being anti-democratic by the well-known lawyer and professor Alan Dershowitz.

After Kahane's election to the Knesset in 1984, the United States government attempted to revoke his U.S. citizenship, an action which Kahane successfully challenged in court. However, in 1987, the Knesset passed a law declaring that a Knesset member could only be an Israeli citizen.  To remain eligible for office, Kahane renounced his United States citizenship, but after being banned from the Knesset for his politics, he again filed suit to get his U.S. citizenship reinstated based on the argument that he was compelled to relinquish it by the Knesset. The court rejected this argument, but he was permitted to continue traveling to the United States.

Assassination

In November 1990, Kahane gave a speech to an audience of mostly Orthodox Jews from Brooklyn, where he warned American Jews to emigrate to Israel before it was "too late". As a crowd gathered around Kahane in the second-floor lecture hall in Midtown Manhattan's New York Marriott East Side, Kahane was assassinated by El Sayyid Nosair, an Egyptian-born U.S. citizen. He was initially charged and acquitted of the murder. Nosair was later convicted of the murder in U.S. District Court for his involvement in the 1993 World Trade Center bombing. Prosecutors were able to try Nosair again for the murder because the federal indictment included the killing as part of the alleged terrorist conspiracy. He was sentenced to life imprisonment and later made a confession to federal agents.

Kahane was buried on Har HaMenuchot, in Jerusalem. He was eulogized by supporters in both the U.S. and in Israel, including Rabbi Moshe Tendler and the Sephardic Chief Rabbi of Israel, Mordechai Eliyahu, who spoke of how little the people understood of Kahane's true value.

Ideology

Kahane argued that there was a glory in Jewish destiny, which came through the observance of the Torah and halakha (Jewish law). He observed, "Democracy and Judaism are not the same thing." Kahane was of the view a Jewish state and a Western democracy were incompatible, since Western democracy is religion-blind, and a Jewish state is religion-oriented by its very name. He feared non-Jewish citizens becoming a majority and voting against the Jewish character of the state: "The question is as follows: if the Arabs settle among us and make enough children to become a majority, will Israel continue to be a Jewish state? Do we have to accept that the Arab majority will decide?" He also said, "Western democracy has to be ruled out. For me, that's cut and dried: There's no question of setting up democracy in Israel, because democracy means equal rights for all, irrespective of racial or religious origins."

Kahane proposed an "exchange of populations" that would continue the Jewish exodus from Arab lands: "A total of some 750,000 Jews fled Arab lands since 1948. Surely it is time for Jews, worried over the huge growth of Arabs in Israel, to consider finishing the exchange of populations that began 35 years ago." Kahane proposed a $40,000 compensation plan for Arabs who would leave voluntarily, and forcible expulsion for those who "don't want to leave". He encouraged retaliatory violence against Arabs who attacked Jews: "I approve of anybody who commits such acts of violence. Really, I don't think that we can sit back and watch Arabs throwing rocks at buses whenever they feel like it. They must understand that a bomb thrown at a Jewish bus is going to mean a bomb thrown at an Arab bus."

In some of his writings, Kahane argued that Israel should never start a war for territory but that if a war were launched against Israel, Biblical territory should be annexed. However, in an interview, he defined Israel's "minimal borders" as follows: "The southern boundary goes up to El Arish, which takes in all of northern Sinai, including Yamit. To the east, the frontier runs along the western part of the East Bank of the Jordan River, hence part of what is now Jordan. Eretz Yisrael also includes part of Lebanon and certain parts of Syria, and part of Iraq, all the way to the Euphrates River." When critics suggested that following Kahane's plans would mean a perpetual war between Jews and Arabs, Kahane responded, "There will be a perpetual war. With or without Kahane."

Support
 Shlomo Aviner stated that Kahane was a righteous man who displayed self-sacrifice for the Jewish nation and also referred to him as a "Torah hero" whose every word was rooted in Torah sources.
 Herbert Bomzer referred to Kahane as "truly immersed in Torah all the time."
 Irving M. Bunim was a strong supporter and admirer of Kahane.
 Shlomo Carlebach and Kahane organized one of the first Noahide conferences in the 1980s for non-Jews wishing to accept the Noahide laws.
 Bob Dylan made positive comments about Kahane. In a 1971 interview for Time magazine, Dylan said, "He's a really sincere guy. He's really put it all together."  According to Kahane, Dylan attended several meetings of the Jewish Defense League to find out "what we're all about", and he started to have talks with the rabbi. Subsequently, Dylan downplayed the extent of his contact with Kahane.
 Mordechai Eliyahu was one of Kahane's staunchest supporters. He wrote a glowing approbation to one of Kahane's books, and eulogized him at his funeral in messianic terms.
 Zvi Yehuda Kook endorsed Kahane in his bid for a Knesset seat. In his letter of support for Kahane, Kook stated, "The presence of Rabbi Meir Kahane and his uncompromising words from the Knesset platform will undoubtedly add strength and value to the obligatory struggle on behalf of the entire Land of Israel."
 Yosef Mendelevitch said "Kahane was a representative for us. His activities made us feel good. His actions showed that Jews cared. His actions may have been controversial, but his role was very important. He was a symbol for Russian Jews."
 Aaron Rakeffet-Rothkoff said, "You can't imagine the influence Kahane had on so many young people. Kahane was a talmid chacham (Torah scholar) that we all looked up to."
 Menachem Mendel Schneerson supported Kahane on many issues concerning Israel, including the issue of Arabs, relinquishing land, building settlements and the incorporation of Jewish law into Israeli policy. After hearing of Kahane's death, Schneerson remarked that "one of the greatest Jewish leaders in history has fallen." He later blessed Kahane's son to be successful in fulfilling his "holy father's" work.
 Avraham Shapira stated that Kahane was an inseparable part of Orthodox Judaism. He later openly backed Kahane's State of Judea movement.
 After the Kach party was outlawed, a member of the Sicarii terrorist group pledged allegiance to Kahane and his political party during a phone call.
 Ahron Soloveichik stated, "What Kahane said was absolutely correct, just we don't say it because the world will criticize us, but somebody had to say it."
 Noach Weinberg wanted to hire Kahane for his staff.
 Ya'akov Yosef described Kahane as one who fulfilled his role faithfully. He declared that "we must learn from his great actions in order that we learn the way of the Torah."

Legacy

Following Kahane's death, no leader emerged to replace him in the movement. However, the idea of transferring populations, attributed mainly to Kahane, was subsequently incorporated into the political platform of several parties in Israel, such as Moledet (applying to Arab non-citizen residents of the West Bank) and Yisrael Beiteinu (in the form of population exchange). Two small Kahanist factions later emerged; one under the name Kach, and the other under the name Kahane chai (Hebrew: כהנא חי, literally "Kahane lives [on]"), the second one being led by his younger son, Binyamin Ze'ev Kahane. Neither one was permitted to participate in the Knesset elections by the Central Elections Committee.

In 1994, following the Cave of the Patriarchs massacre of Palestinian Muslim worshippers in Hebron by Kach supporter Baruch Goldstein, in which 29 Muslim worshipers were killed, the Israeli government declared both parties to be terrorist organizations. The US State Department also added Kach and Kahane Chai to its list of Foreign Terrorist Organizations.

In the 2003 Knesset elections, Herut, which had split off from the National Union list, ran with Michael Kleiner and former Kach activist Baruch Marzel taking the top two spots on the list. The joint effort narrowly missed the 1.5% barrier. In the following 2006 elections, the Jewish National Front, led by Baruch Marzel, fared better, but it also failed to pass the minimum threshold. A follower of Kahane who was involved with Kach for many years, Michael Ben-Ari, was elected to the Knesset in the 2009 elections on renewed National Union list. He stood again in the 2013 elections as the second candidate on the list of Otzma LeYisrael, but the party failed to pass the minimum threshold.

In 2007, the FBI released over a thousand documents relating to its daily surveillance of Kahane from the early 1960s.

In 2015, Kahane's grandson, Meir Ettinger, was detained by Israeli law enforcement. He was the alleged leader of the radical Jewish group "The Revolt". In an online "manifesto" echoing some of his grandfather's teachings, Ettinger promotes the "dispossession of gentiles" who live in Israel and the establishment of a new "kingdom of Israel", a theocracy ruled according to the Halacha. Ettinger's writings condemned Israel's government, mainstream rabbis, and the IDF, and also have denounced Christian churches as "idolatry".

Libby Kahane, his widow, published the first volume of a biography Rabbi Meir Kahane: His Life and Thought Vol. One: 1932–1975 around 2008. A contributor to Haartez said the book "lacks serious analysis", "ignores important unflattering details" and "serves as an apologetic". In 2016, Libby Kahane claimed that modern Jewish extremists in Israel do not follow the ideology of her late husband. She justified that claim by arguing that, unlike modern Jewish extremists, Rabbi Kahane had a more mature approach that did not encourage illegal activities.

 The prosecution argued that Arab MK Haneen Zoabi should be banned for denying the Jewish people's existence, and she was banned by the Central Elections Committee, which uses the Kahane precedent. A week later, the ruling was unanimously overturned by the Supreme Court. Attempts to ban the Strong Israel and Balad political parties by using the Kahane precedent were also overturned.

In 2017, The Forward reported that some of Kahane's followers were aligning themselves with white nationalists and the alt-right. Other Kahanists declared that such moves did not reflect Kahane's teachings, and they supported that declaration by arguing that Kahane worked together with African Americans.

See also
 Jewish fundamentalism
 Politics of Israel
 Zionist political violence

Publications

By Kahane
 (Partially under pseudonym Michael King; with Joseph Churba) The Jewish Stake in Vietnam, Crossroads, 1967
 Never Again! A Program for Survival, Pyramid Books, 1972
 Time to Go Home, Nash, 1972.
 Letters from Prison, Jewish Identity Center, 1974
 Our Challenge: The Chosen Land, 1974
 The Story of the Jewish Defense League, Chilton, 1975, 2nd edition, Institute for Publication of the Writings of Rabbi Meir Kahane, (Brooklyn, NY), 2000
 Why Be Jewish? Intermarriage, Assimilation, and Alienation, Stein & Day, 1977
 Listen, Vanessa, I Am a Zionist, Institute of the Authentic Jewish Idea, 1978
 They Must Go, Grosset & Dunlop, 1981
 Forty Years, Institute of the Jewish Idea, 2nd edition, 1983
 Uncomfortable Questions for Comfortable Jews, Lyle Stuart, 1987
 Israel: Revolution or Referendum, Barricade Books (Secaucus, NJ), 1990
 Or ha-ra'yon, English title: The Jewish Idea, n.p. (Jerusalem), 1992, translated from the Hebrew by Raphael Blumberg, Institute for Publication of the Writings of Rabbi Meir Kahane (Jerusalem), 1996
 On Jews and Judaism: Selected Articles 1961–1990, Institute for Publication of the Writings of Rabbi Meir Kahane (Jerusalem), 1993
 Perush ha-Makabi: al Sefer Devarim, Institute for Publication of the Writings of Rabbi Meir Kahane (Jerusalem), 1993, 1995
 Pirush HaMaccabee: al Sefer Shemu'el u-Nevi'im rishonim, Institute for Publication of the Writings of Rabbi Meir Kahane (Jerusalem), 1994
 Listen World, Listen Jew, 3rd edition, Institute for the Publication of the Writings of Rabbi Meir Kahane (Jerusalem), 1995
 Beyond Words, 1st edition, Institute for the Publication of the Writings of Rabbi Meir Kahane (Jerusalem), 2010.
 Kohen ve-navi: osef ma'amarim, ha-Makhon le-hotsa'at kitve ha-Rav Kahana (Jerusalem), 2000
 Cuckooland, illustrated by Shulamith bar Itzhak (yet unpublished).

About Kahane
For supplementary information and insights:
 .
 Miracle Man, Yeshivat "HaRaayon HaYehudi" (Jerusalem), 2010
 .
 .
 .
 .
 .
 .
 .
 .
 .

References

External links

 
 Words online educational resource
 FBI file on Meir Kahane

 
1932 births
1990 deaths
1990 murders in the United States
20th-century American criminals
20th-century Israeli rabbis
American emigrants to Israel
American Kahanists
American members of the clergy convicted of crimes
American Orthodox Jews
American Orthodox rabbis
American people of Latvian-Jewish descent
Assassinated American activists
Assassinated Israeli politicians
Assassinated rabbis
Brooklyn College alumni
Burials at Har HaMenuchot
Ethnic supremacy
Far-right politics
Israeli activists
Israeli anti-communists
Israeli government officials convicted of crimes
Israeli Kahanists
Israeli Orthodox rabbis
Israeli people murdered abroad
Israeli politicians convicted of crimes
Israeli terrorism victims
Jewish American writers
Jewish anti-communists
Jewish religious terrorism
Kach and Kahane Chai politicians
Kahanism
Male murder victims
Members of the 11th Knesset (1984–1988)
Mir Yeshiva alumni
Murdered American Jews
New York Law School alumni
Orthodox rabbis from New York City
People murdered in New York City
Philosophers of Judaism
Rabbis convicted of crimes
Religious Zionist Orthodox rabbis
Writers from Brooklyn
Writers on antisemitism
Writers on Zionism